Pine Ridge is a town in Lexington County, South Carolina, United States. The population was 2,064 at the 2010 census. It is part of the Columbia, South Carolina Metropolitan Statistical Area.

Geography
Pine Ridge is located at  (33.910857, -81.107635).

According to the United States Census Bureau, the town has a total area of 3.7 square miles (9.7 km2), of which 3.7 square miles (9.6 km2) is land and 0.27% is water.

Demographics

As of the census of 2000, there were 1,593 people, 606 households, and 458 families residing in the town. The population density was 429.1 people per square mile (165.8/km2). There were 626 housing units at an average density of 168.6 per square mile (65.1/km2). The racial makeup of the town was 92.78% White, 5.15% African American, 0.31% Native American, 0.88% Asian, 0.19% from other races, and 0.69% from two or more races. Hispanic or Latino of any race were 1.19% of the population.

There were 606 households, out of which 37.5% had children under the age of 18 living with them, 61.7% were married couples living together, 10.4% had a female householder with no husband present, and 24.4% were non-families. 19.8% of all households were made up of individuals, and 5.1% had someone living alone who was 65 years of age or older. The average household size was 2.63 and the average family size was 3.05.

In the town, the population was spread out, with 26.6% under the age of 18, 7.6% from 18 to 24, 29.8% from 25 to 44, 28.4% from 45 to 64, and 7.6% who were 65 years of age or older. The median age was 37 years. For every 100 females, there were 95.0 males. For every 100 females age 18 and over, there were 92.9 males.

The median income for a household in the town was $48,750, and the median income for a family was $54,514. Males had a median income of $35,243 versus $28,846 for females. The per capita income for the town was $18,534. About 6.6% of families and 9.1% of the population were below the poverty line, including 12.2% of those under age 18 and 17.5% of those age 65 or over.

Education
Pine Ridge has a public library, a branch of the Lexington County Library.

References

External links
 

Towns in Lexington County, South Carolina
Towns in South Carolina
Columbia metropolitan area (South Carolina)